Elizabeth Waterman is an American photographer, known for her images of millennial artists and American strip club culture.

Early life and education

Elizabeth was born in Taos, New Mexico, United States. She earned her BA in Fine Arts at the University of Southern California.

Career

Elizabeth is the author or Moneygame, a female perspective photo book of strippers from various clubs after she visited more than 30 clubs in New York City, Los Angeles, Miami, Las Vegas and New Orleans. The book was distributed by the Portuguese publisher XYZ Books.

In October 2022, Waterman did a solo exhibition at Boogie Wall, an all-female focused gallery in London, featuring pictures from her book Moneygame.

In December 2022, she released a photo series called "Women of the Sidewalk Project", in partnership with non-profit organization The Sidewalk Project. As a part of the holiday season, they released 12 days of portrait photos of transgender women living on the Los Angeles streets.

Publications

Books 

 Moneygame, 2022.

Awards and recognition

 Prix de la Photographie (PX3) 2020; Honorable Mention in Fine Art/People
 British Journal of Photography, Portrait of Humanity Book, Publication, May 2019
 Prix de la Photographie (PX3) 2018; Gold Winner in the Documentary Category, Silver Winner in the People Category, and Honorable Mention
 ''16th Annual Smithsonian.com Photo Contest, Photo of the Day, Editor’s Pick(September 21, 2018)

Personal life

She is married to an American photographer, film director and author Michael Grecco. The couple lives in Los Angeles, United States.

References

External links 
 

Living people
1985 births
American portrait photographers
21st-century American women photographers
21st-century American photographers
Artists from Taos, New Mexico
Photographers from New Mexico